Roy Russell Garforth (30 April 1918 – November 1991) was a British water polo player. He competed in the men's tournament at the 1948 Summer Olympics.

References

1918 births
1991 deaths
British male water polo players
Olympic water polo players of Great Britain
Water polo players at the 1948 Summer Olympics
Sportspeople from Bradford